Santigwar is a 2019 Filipino horror, fantasy and supernatural film directed by Joven Tan and starring actress Alexa Ilacad in her first ever lead film.

Under Horseshoe Studios and Reality Entertainment, the film premiered nationwide on October 30, 2019.

Plot 
Hasmin (Alexa Ilacad) is a young girl who inherited the power and skill of a Santigwar from her father. The Santigwar is a kind of albularyo who does not only heals and does magic, but also fights against mythical creatures. As a Santigwar herself, she has been on a decade-long hunt for a specific aswang clan as she and her father Mang Nano (Dan Fernandez) aims to track down the aswangs responsible for killing her late mother Siony (MJ Lastimosa).

While on the lookout, a group of fun-seeking boys—Aldrin (Marlo Mortel), Jay (Paulo Angeles), Benny (Keann Johnson), and Carlo (Marco Gallo) head to Aldrin's girlfriend Ara's (Pam Gonzales) province for a visit. As the band of teenagers arrive, crossed paths with her, and triggered her senses, chaos in the small town began. She then realizes that the aswang is closer to her now than ever. Fearing for their safety, she pushes them to leave.

Soon later, she uncovered the truth that linked her Santigwar family to the enemies.

Cast

Main Cast 

 Alexa Ilacad as Hasmin
 Marlo Mortel as Aldrin
 Paulo Angeles as Jay
 Keann Johnson as Benny

Supporting Cast 

 Lui Manansala as Nana Rosa
 Marco Gallo as Carlo
 Michelle Vito as Lea
 Dan Fernandez as Mang Nano
 Aubrey Miles as Ynes
 Michelle Liggayu as Melai
 Pam Gonzales as Ara
 Emie Conjurado as Sabel
 MJ Lastimosa as Siony

References

External links 

 

2019 films
Films directed by Joven Tan